The 2016 Dhivehi Premier League was the second season of the Dhivehi Premier League, the top division of Maldivian football. The season began on 19 April 2015. The league was made up of the 8 clubs.

Format
All eight teams play against each other in Three Round Format. Team with most total points at the end of the season will be crowned as Dhivehi Premier League champion and qualified to the AFC Cup. Top four teams qualify for the President's Cup.

Teams
A total of 8 teams will be contesting in the league, including 7 sides from the 2015 Dhivehi Premier League season and one promoted from the 2015 Second Division Football Tournament.

Teams and their divisions
Note: Table lists clubs in alphabetical order.

Personnel and kits

Note: Flags indicate national team as has been defined under FIFA eligibility rules. Players may hold more than one non-FIFA nationality.

Coaching changes

Foreign players

League table

Season summary

Round One & Two

Round Three

Positions by round
The table lists the positions of teams after each week of matches.

Season statistics

Top scorers

Hat-tricks

 4 Player scored four goals

2016 Dhivehi Premier League play-off

References

Dhivehi Premier League seasons
Maldives
Maldives
1